Timothy Lee Richmond (June 7, 1955 – August 13, 1989) was an American race car driver from Ashland, Ohio. He competed in IndyCar racing before transferring to NASCAR's Winston Cup Series. Richmond was one of the first drivers to change from open wheel racing to NASCAR stock cars full-time, which later became an industry trend. He won the 1980 Indianapolis 500 Rookie of the Year award and had 13 victories during eight NASCAR seasons.

Richmond achieved his top NASCAR season in 1986 when he finished third in points. He won seven races that season, more than any other driver on the tour. When he missed the season-opening Daytona 500 in February 1987, media reported that he had pneumonia. The infection most likely resulted from his compromised immune system, which was weakened by AIDS. Despite the state of his health, Richmond competed in eight races in 1987, winning two events and one pole position before his final race in August of that year. He attempted a comeback in 1988 before NASCAR banned him for testing positive for excessive over-the-counter drugs, ibuprofen and pseudoephedrine; NASCAR later announced they gave Richmond a new test and tested negative. Richmond filed a lawsuit against NASCAR after NASCAR insisted they wanted access to his entire medical record before they would reinstate him. After losing the lawsuit, Richmond withdrew from racing. NASCAR later stated their original test was a "bad test."

Richmond grew up in a wealthy family and lived a freewheeling lifestyle, earning him the nickname "Hollywood". In describing Richmond's influence in racing, Charlotte Motor Speedway president Humpy Wheeler said, "We've never had a race driver like Tim in stock car racing. He was almost a James Dean-like character." When Richmond was cast for a bit part in the 1983 movie Stroker Ace, "He fell right in with the group working on the film," said director Hal Needham. Cole Trickle, the main character in the movie Days of Thunder, played by Tom Cruise, was loosely based on Richmond and his interaction with Harry Hyde and Rick Hendrick.

Early life
Richmond grew up in Ashland, Ohio. His parents, Al and Evelyn (née Warner) Richmond, met in the course of their work. Al was a welder for pipe construction companies and Evelyn was a field office manager. Noticing that highway crews had to dig up the entire highway to lay pipe, Al designed a machine to bore underneath the highway. To market this invention, he founded Richmond Manufacturing, which eventually exported machines worldwide.

Tim's driving days started as a toddler when he was given a go-kart that he often drove inside buildings and across his lawn. He later raced the kart at tracks in Moreland and New Pittsburg. Richmond grew up in a well-to-do family, and was sometimes therefore treated differently by his classmates, so his parents enrolled him in Miami Military Academy in Miami, Florida. During his years in Miami, Tim and his mother moved to Florida and his father stayed in Ohio. While home in Ohio over a summer break, he met local drag racer Raymond Beadle through lifelong friend Fred Miller. When Richmond reached age 16, his parents purchased him a Pontiac Trans Am, a speedboat and a Piper Cherokee airplane for his birthday. Yet his mother Evelyn often worried about spoiling her only son. She once said, "Tim was lazy...", and "... I did everything for him. I ruined him, I admit it. He was my whole life."

Richmond excelled in sports; he set a conference record in high hurdles and his high school football career was stellar enough that the academy retired his sports jersey after his gridiron days were over. Miami Military Academy named him Athlete of the Year in 1970. Richmond's other interests included flying, and he earned his private pilot license at age 16. Following high school graduation, Richmond attended Ashland University for about one year before dropping out.

Racing career

Open wheel racing
A friend of Richmond's father co-owned a sprint car and Richmond joined the team as a crew member for Dave Shoemaker. In 1976, 21-year-old Richmond took the car onto Lakeville Speedway at Lakeville, Ohio for some practice laps. "Somebody put a stopwatch on me," Richmond said. "I was running laps faster than Dave had been. It was the first time I had ever driven a race car." Richmond and his father found a red, white and blue-colored No. 98 car in Pennsylvania, which was the same number and paint scheme that Richmond used on model cars as a child. In his first competition at the track, officials placed Richmond in the slowest heat. He passed several cars before spinning out and breaking an axle. Although he made several attempts to get the car pointed in the right direction, the broken axle prevented the car from driving straight. After being towed to the pits, he parked the car for the rest of the event. Later that season, they towed the car to Eldora Speedway, only to have Richmond crash the car again. In response, Richmond's father fired him as the driver. The next season, Al Richmond bought a SuperModified better suited to his son's driving style.  In 1977 Tim Richmond became both Sandusky Speedway's Rookie of the Year and the SuperModified class track champion.

Richmond returned to racing sprint cars in the United States Automobile Club's (USAC) national sprint car tour in 1978. Competing in 12 races, he finished 30th in points as the series' Rookie of the Year. That year he attended Jim Russell's road racing school at Willow Springs International Motorsports Park, setting a student course record. Richmond raced in a 1978 Mini Indy car event at Phoenix International Raceway, winning the Formula Super Vee support event in a Lola T620. The win attracted sponsors and attention from major owners like Roger Penske. He also competed in USAC's Silver Crown series.

Richmond's father bought an Eagle Indy Car chassis and an Offenhauser engine for the 1979 race at Michigan International Speedway. Richmond qualified 21st fastest with a  lap, significantly slower than Bobby Unser's  pole position speed. The race ended for him when his motor blew up on the fourth lap, and he finished last (23rd). Owner Pat Santello was looking for a driver to replace Larry Rice for his CART team at the following race at Watkins Glen International, so he gave Richmond a test at Willow Springs Raceway where he had previously set the student record. Santello hired Richmond, who then qualified 15th fastest for the event and finished in eighth place, the best of his IndyCar career. Richmond raced in three more events that season.

Also in 1979, Richmond tested Kenny Reece's unusual "3-to-1" Supermodified at a 7.5-mile high-speed oval test track in Ohio. The car was unique in that it featured 3 wheels on the right side for added grip on oval tracks, but only 1 wheel on the center of the left side, along with a left-offset aluminum Chevrolet ZL-1 V8 engine. Richmond was able to lap the test track at over 200 MPH, but found doing so in a car with no left front wheel slightly unnerving. The car was tested, but outlawed before it could actually be raced.

During practice for the 1980 Indianapolis 500, Richmond set the fastest unofficial practice speed of the month, besting even race favorite Johnny Rutherford in the vaunted Chaparral. His hopes for the pole were dashed with a crash in morning practice on the first day of qualifying. After repairs he qualified 19th for the race. He worked his way up to the top 10 during the race, led a lap, and finished ninth as he ran out of fuel at the end of the race. To the delight of the crowd, winner Rutherford gave him a ride back to the pits. He was named the 1980 Indianapolis 500 Rookie of the Year. "I busted up a few Indy cars right after that," he said. "Milwaukee, Mid-Ohio. . . at Michigan I cut one in two. I was afraid my racing career would come to a halt. So when I got an offer to drive stock cars, I took it, and it turned out I liked driving them better."

NASCAR

Pocono Raceway President Joseph Mattioli III convinced Richmond to make the change to stock car racing on the NASCAR circuit. Richmond made his first NASCAR start two months after winning the Indianapolis 500 Rookie of the Year award. He debuted at the Coca-Cola 500 at Pocono on July 27, 1980, finishing 12th in a D. K. Ulrich-owned Chevrolet. That season, he competed in five events, with two DNFs (did not finish) and three 12th-place finishes. Overall, he finished the 1980 season 41st in points.

Richmond raced for three teams in 1981. He started the season by competing in 15 events for Ulrich. He had his first career top 10 finish, taking tenth place at Bristol Motor Speedway, soon followed by a sixth at Talladega and a seventh-place finish at Texas World Speedway. After Kennie Childers hired him away from Ulrich mid-season, Richmond had top 10 finishes at Pocono and Bristol. For the final seven races of the season, he drove for Bob Rogers and had a top 10 finish at Dover International Speedway. Overall for the season, Richmond had six top 10 finishes to place 16th in season points.

Richmond started 1982 without a ride before getting a one-race deal to drive for Mike Lovern's Fast Company Limited, Billie Harvey, at the Rockingham track. Richmond completed 112 laps of the 492-lap event to finish 31st, retiring from the race with engine problems. For the following event, Richmond was hired to drive J.D. Stacy's No. 2 car. In his first race for the team, Richmond earned his first career top 5 finish when he placed fifth at Darlington Raceway. Returning to Pocono, he finished second, before winning his first race on the road course at Riverside, California the following week. Later that season, he earned his first pole position at Bristol. The tour returned to Riverside for the final race of the season where Richmond won his second race, sweeping both events at the track. Benny Parsons said that "watching Richmond go through the Esses was unbelievable". For the season, Richmond had twelve top 10s, two wins, and one pole to finish 26th in points.

In 1983, Richmond began racing for Raymond Beadle whom he had known before he started racing. He returned to the three-cornered Pocono racetrack, earning his first oval victory. During the season, he accumulated four pole positions (Darlington, Pocono, Charlotte, and Atlanta), one win (Pocono), and fifteen top 10s on his way to finishing tenth in season points. He made his first appearance in a NASCAR Busch Series car, but did not finish any of the three races he entered that season.

 
Esquire magazine named Richmond as one of "the best of the new generation" in 1984. That year he had one win at North Wilkesboro Speedway and second-place finishes at Dover, Darlington and Riverside. Richmond finished the 1984 season 12th in points, with 11 finishes in the top 10 and in six in the top 5. In 1985, the final season that Richmond competed for Beadle, his best finish was a second-place run at Bristol. He ended the season 11th in points with 13 Top 10s in 28 races. His crew chief for the season was newcomer Barry Dodson who won the 1989 championship with Rusty Wallace. In the Busch Series, he qualified at the pole position in the two races he entered, and won the Charlotte race.

Richmond joined Hendrick Motorsports in 1986, where he teamed up with veteran crew chief Harry Hyde. It took the team until the middle of the season to gel. Richmond had suffered a 64-race winless streak that was finally broken at the Van Scoy Diamond Mine 500 at Pocono in June 1986. After two straight second-place finishes at Charlotte and Riverside, Richmond started the Pocono event in third place inside the second row. That race saw a caution for rain with five laps left before the halfway point. NASCAR wanted the cars to get to the halfway point to make the race official, so the sanctioning body had the drivers slowly circle the track. It took the drivers 26 minutes to complete the laps, and the rain was so heavy that some drivers had to look out their side windows because they could not see out their windshields. Two hours later, the track had dried and the race resumed with Richmond in third. After Richmond's car was adjusted to remove the "push", the car was more to his liking. Because his radio did not work, he was unable to communicate with his crew chief, Hyde, and he made his final pit stop with 37 laps left. Hyde worried that Richmond had stopped a lap too early to ensure that he would have enough fuel to make it to the end. After Richmond took the lead with 30 laps left in the race, Dale Earnhardt made up three seconds on Richmond's five-second lead. With four laps to go, Buddy Arrington spun in a three-car accident. The remaining laps of the race where completed slowly under caution and Richmond took the checkered flag for the victory. He had led 97 laps, including the final 30, taking his first victory in a Rick Hendrick car.

The tour returned to Pocono a month later, and Richmond battled for another victory in a fog-shortened event. In the final 8-lap sprint, Richmond competed in a three-car battle with Geoff Bodine and Ricky Rudd. Richmond crossed the finish line beside Rudd, winning the race by 0.05 seconds. He notched four more victories that season, and over a span of twelve races, Richmond earned three second-place finishes, and six wins. The National Motorsports Press Association named him Co-Driver of the Year with Earnhardt after Richmond accumulated 13 top 5 finishes and 16 in the top 10. He had a career-best third-place finish in points after winning seven events in 1986, in what was his last full NASCAR season.

Illness and death
Richmond fell ill the day after the 1986 NASCAR annual banquet during a promotional trip to New York City. He was not well enough to begin the 1987 NASCAR season despite lengthy hospitalization in Cleveland and further rest at home; when Richmond missed the Daytona 500, his condition was reported as double pneumonia. Media later reported that he had Acquired Immune Deficiency Syndrome (AIDS). He returned to Pocono for the Miller High Life 500 during the middle of the year. Starting third, he led by the fifth lap and ultimately led 82 laps, including the final 46, to win the race by eight car-lengths over Bill Elliott. In the middle of the race, Richmond's car suffered gearbox problems. Because he could use only fourth (high) gear, he had to use that gear to slowly exit the pits. Richmond was emotional after the victory, saying, "I had tears in my eyes when I took the checkered flag. Then every time anyone congratulated me, I started bawling again." Richmond earned a victory in the next race at Riverside, and made his final 1987 start at Michigan International Speedway's Champion Spark Plug 400 that August, finishing 29th with a blown engine. He resigned from Hendrick Motorsports in September 1987.

Although Richmond attempted a comeback in 1988, NASCAR suspended him for testing positive for banned substances. Days later the substances were identified as Sudafed, a non-prescription over-the-counter allergy medication, and Advil, an over-the-counter pain reliever. In April 1988, Richmond sued NASCAR over the suspension. In the 2010 ESPN documentary film Tim Richmond: To The Limit, Bill France Jr. of NASCAR acknowledged that it "was not a good test." NASCAR also demanded he release his medical records to them, which he refused. Although he retested later that year and was reinstated, he could not find a car to drive. In his final public appearance in February 1988,  Richmond denied that he abused drugs and said that a mistake had been made in his drug test. His suit with NASCAR was settled out-of-court, the terms sealed.

Richmond withdrew into his condo in Florida. There were by then rumors of HIV and AIDS, which he denied.  He was later hospitalized in West Palm Beach.

ESPN sent a get-well-soon card to Richmond when it aired the July 1989 NASCAR race at Pocono. The television network showed highlights of Richmond's victory at the track from 1986. "Tim had Hollywood good looks and the charisma of Tom Cruise," said his friend Dr. Jerry Punch. "There he was in victory lane with the team all around him and beauty queens hanging all over him. It was important for the people at the hospital to see Tim the way he really was, when he was healthy and handsome and vital, not the way he was as they saw him every day in the hospital."

On August 13, 1989, Richmond died at the age of 34, about two years after his final NASCAR race. He was buried in Ashland, Ohio.

The secrecy surrounding the circumstance of his death caused speculation for several days. At the time, Punch stated that Richmond had been hospitalized due to a motorcycle accident, though it is unlikely that Richmond had the strength to ride a motorcycle during his last months. Ten days after his death, on August 23, the Richmond family held a press conference to reveal that Richmond died from complications from AIDS, which he acquired from an unknown woman. Richmond's physician, Dr. David Dodson, said: "There's no way of knowing who that woman was. Tim was a celebrity with a lot of charisma, a handsome guy. He naturally attracted a lot of women." Punch later claimed that more than 90 drivers and personnel underwent HIV testing in the wake of Richmond's death.

Legacy

In 1990, a few months after Richmond's death,  Washington television station WJLA-TV and reporter Roberta Baskin reported that Dr. Forest Tennant, who was then the National Football League's drug adviser, "falsified drug tests" that ultimately helped shorten Richmond's NASCAR career.  Baskin reported that sealed court documents and interviews showed Tennant and NASCAR used "allegedly false drug-test results in 1988 to bar Richmond from racing".  Baskin also stated that NASCAR had targeted Richmond, requesting that Tennant establish a substance-abuse policy with Richmond in mind. A series of drug tests and falsely reported positive results shortly before the 1988 Daytona 500 kept Richmond from driving in what was to have been his last big race...", the report said.  The New York Times published the findings. While neither Tennant nor NASCAR supplied an official response at the time, NASCAR did confirm that they were seeking to replace Tennant.

The Ashland County Sports Hall of Fame inducted Richmond in their second class in 1996. In 1998, NASCAR named Richmond one of its 50 greatest drivers of all time. He was inducted into the International Motorsports Hall of Fame in 2002. The Mansfield Motorsports Park ARCA Re/Max Series race in 2009 was named the Tim Richmond Memorial ARCA Re/Max 250 in honor of the area native.  The race at Mansfield was co-promoted by Mattioli's son Joseph Mattioli III.

The documentary film Tim Richmond: To The Limit was produced as part of ESPN's 30 for 30 series with a premiere date of October 19, 2010.

In 2018, Dalton Sargeant drove the No. 25 truck for GMS Racing in honor of Richmond.

In 2019, an ARCA Menards Series driver who coincidentally shares the same name drove an identical paint scheme in his No. 06 to Richmond's No. 25 when he drove for Hendrick Motorsports.

In June 2019 current Hendrick Motorsports driver Alex Bowman announced in the Darlington Throwback Race he would run a Tim Richmond throwback to the No. 25 Folgers car.

Motorsports career results

NASCAR
(key) (Bold – Pole position awarded by qualifying time. Italics – Pole position earned by points standings or practice time. * – Most laps led.)

Winston Cup Series

Daytona 500

Busch Series

American open wheel

CART Series

(key) (Races in bold indicate pole position)

USAC Champ Car series

Indianapolis 500 results

References

Further reading
Poole, David. Tim Richmond: The Fast Life and Remarkable Times of NASCAR's Top Gun Champaign, IL: Sports Publications, 2005.

External links

1955 births
1989 deaths
People from Ashland, Ohio
Racing drivers from Ohio
Indianapolis 500 drivers
Indianapolis 500 Rookies of the Year
NASCAR drivers
Champ Car drivers
American Speed Association drivers
Ashland University alumni
AIDS-related deaths in Florida
Burials in Ohio
International Motorsports Hall of Fame inductees
Hendrick Motorsports drivers
NASCAR controversies